Wilfred Edwards (23 October 1889 – 15 July 1950) was a British swimmer. He competed in the men's 100 metre freestyle event at the 1908 Summer Olympics.

Edwards served in the Royal Army Veterinary Corps during the First World War and was mentioned in dispatches.

References

1889 births
1950 deaths
Military personnel from Chester
British male swimmers
Olympic swimmers of Great Britain
Swimmers at the 1908 Summer Olympics
Sportspeople from Chester
Royal Army Veterinary Corps soldiers
British male freestyle swimmers
British Army personnel of World War I
20th-century British people